The Nagaland Legislative Assembly is the unicameral legislature of the Indian state of Nagaland.

The seat of the Legislative Assembly is at Kohima, the capital of the state. The term of the Legislative Assembly is five years, unless dissolved earlier. Presently, it comprises 60 members who are directly elected from single-seat constituencies.

History
Nagaland became a state of India on 1 December 1963, and after elections in January, 1964, the first Nagaland Legislative Assembly was formed, on 11 February 1964. In 1974, the strength of the Legislative assembly was increased from 40, to the present strength of 60 members.

List of constituencies

Notes

References

Nagaland
Constituencies of Nagaland Legislative Assembly